Erin Alexandra Burns (born 22 June 1988) is an Australian cricketer who plays as a right-handed batter and right-arm off break bowler. She has appeared in one One Day Internationals and five Twenty20 Internationals for Australia, making her debut in September 2019 against the West Indies. She plays for New South Wales in the Women's National Cricket League and Sydney Sixers in the Women's Big Bash League. She has previously played for Tasmania, Wellington, Hobart Hurricanes, Australian Capital Territory and Birmingham Phoenix.

Early life
Born in Wollongong, Burns found herself unable to progress any further through the strong New South Wales system than the state's second XI.  In 2009, however, the Tasmanian Roar was casting around for extra talent for its entry to interstate competition, and rang Burns with an offer of a place which she accepted.

Tasmanian Roar
Burns won the Tasmanian Roar Player of the Year award for 2009–10. She was a squad member of the Southern Stars in 2011, and toured New Zealand with the Shooting Stars in 2012.  She remained part of the Shooting Stars squad, and was once again Tasmanian Roar Player of the Year, in 2012–13.  In that season's Australian Women's Twenty20 Cup, she played such a prominent role for the Roar, including by hitting 90 runs against Victorian Spirit off just 50 deliveries, with 10 boundaries and four sixes, that she was named the ACA women's Player of the Month for December 2012.

In late 2013, Burns suffered a serious cartilage tear in her knee that threatened her playing career.  However, Sydney Swans club doctor Nathan Gibbs treated the injury with stem cell injections, which were more effective than anticipated;  Burns returned to the Roar at a T20 match in November 2014.

In October 2016, during the opening round of that season's WNCL, Burns top scored for the Roar in the match against the South Australian Scorpions with 45 runs, and also took two wickets.

Hobart Hurricanes
Burns was included in the Hurricanes squad for its inaugural WBBL01 season (2015–16), during which she scored 224 runs at 17.23 with a highest score of 34, and took 7 wickets at 30.14 with best figures of 2/22.  She also achieved the feat of taking three catches in a single innings.

During the WBBL02 season (2016–17), Burns played a key role in two Hurricanes wins.  On 18 December 2016, she hit a four through mid-wicket off the final ball of a super over to claim victory against the Melbourne Renegades, and propel the Hurricanes to equal first on the WBBL table.  On 5 January 2017, after being promoted to open the Hurricanes' innings against Sydney Thunder, she scored 46 runs, and shared in a second wicket partnership of 64 with Heather Knight, to help lead the Hurricanes to a match winning 171/3, which eventually proved to be the highest innings total for WBBL|02.

In November 2018, she was named in the Sydney Sixers' squad for the 2018–19 Women's Big Bash League season.

International career
In August 2019, Burns was named in Australia's squad for their series against the West Indies. She made her Women's One Day International (WODI) debut for Australia against the West Indies on 8 September 2019. She made her Women's Twenty20 International (WT20I) debut for Australia, also against the West Indies, on 14 September 2019.

In January 2020, she was named in Australia's squad for the 2020 ICC Women's T20 World Cup in Australia. In January 2022, Burns was named in Australia's A squad for their series against England A, with the matches being played alongside the Women's Ashes.

Personal life
Burns completed a degree in Exercise Science in 2009, and later, with the assistance of a University of Sydney Elite Athlete Program (EAP) scholarship, obtained a master's degree in Physiotherapy.  She has worked as both an Exercise Physiologist and Physiotherapist, and has a particular interest in sporting injuries.  While undergoing rehabilitation for her knee injury, Burns took up cycling to strengthen her knee.  In 2015, she completed a  bike ride from her home town of Wollongong to Melbourne to raise money for Bowel Cancer Australia, in honour of her late father, who died from the disease in 2005.

Burns married her wife Anna in 2019, and has supported initiatives to include the LGBTQI community as part of the Sydney Sixers.

References

External links

Erin Burns at Cricket Australia

1988 births
Living people
Sportspeople from Wollongong
Australian women cricketers
University of Sydney alumni
Australia women One Day International cricketers
Australia women Twenty20 International cricketers
ACT Meteors cricketers
Hobart Hurricanes (WBBL) cricketers
New South Wales Breakers cricketers
Tasmanian Tigers (women's cricket) cricketers
Sydney Sixers (WBBL) cricketers
Wellington Blaze cricketers
Lesbian sportswomen
LGBT cricketers
Australian LGBT sportspeople
Birmingham Phoenix cricketers
Manchester Originals cricketers
Royal Challengers Bangalore (WPL) cricketers